This article is an excerpt of a List of IT Companies located in the Philippines.

References

 
IT companies